Thiruvananthapuram Railway Division (TVC) is one of the six administrative divisions of the Southern Railway, Indian Railways. It has its headquarters at Thiruvananthapuram, the capital city of the state of Kerala, India. Thiruvananthapuram Division was formed on 2 October 1979 which serves the eight districts of  southern part of the Kerala, Kanniyakumari district and some parts of Tirunelveli District in Tamil Nadu. With 104 stations in its territorial jurisdiction, it is the fourth largest out of six divisions in Southern Railway. It is the southernmost railway division of India and manages 625 km of route track and 108 railway stations in the states of Kerala and Tamil Nadu. The major stations of the division are Thiruvananthapuram Central, Ernakulam Junction, Kollam Junction, Thrissur, Kottayam, Ernakulam Town, Chengannur, Kayamkulam, Aluva, Nagercoil Junction, Kanniyakumari, Alappuzha, Changanasseri, Tiruvalla, Kochuveli, Varkala,Mavelikara.

Major routes
 Kollam–Thiruvananthapuram trunk line
Thiruvananthapuram-Kanyakumari Line
Thiruvananthapuram-Ernakulam 
Ernakulam-Alappuzha-Kayamkulam
Ernakulam-Kottayam-Kayamkulam
ICTT Vallarpadom Rail Link
Sabari Railway line (Planned)
Balaramapuram-Vizhinjam seaport (Planned)
Thakazhi-Thiruvalla (Project Abandoned)
Kottayam-Madurai-Ernakulam (Thripunithura-Muvattupuzha, Idukki. Project abandoned due to lack of interest)
Airport line (Connecting Ernakulam Junction with the International Airport through a new halt station. The foundation stone was laid in 2010. Project abandoned due to lack of interest and land acquisition problems).

Stations
The list includes the stations under the Thiruvananthapuram railway division and their station category.

Terminal facilities
Thiruvananthapuram railway division has the credit of building and maintaining highest number of passenger terminals in any railway division within southern railway. Passenger terminals are operational at 
Alappuzha, 
Ernakulam Jn, 
Thiruvananthapuram Central, 
Kollam Jn, 
Nagercoil Jn, Kanyakumari 
and Kochuveli.

New passenger terminal is proposed at Nemom which serves as alternate satellite terminal station to the Thiruvananthapuram Central to ease the congestion other than the present Kochuveli.

MEMU/suburban trains

A MEMU shed for Kollam was proposed in 2008's Indian Railway Budget. Kollam MEMU CarShed was formally commissioned on 1 December 2013. Currently the MEMU trains runs between Kollam Junction to Greater Cochin region via Kottayam and via Alappuzha. The fastest three phase ICF Memu cars are plying in this section. Kollam MEMU Shed is the second MEMU Shed in Kerala, which is equipped with most modern facilities. There was a plan initially to conduct suburban railway between Trivandrum Central to Chengannur and Haripad at regular intervals. But due to lack of dedicated lines and automated signalling system on the state the project was abandoned

Freight traffic
The freight traffic marked an all-time high record with Rs 466.41 crore earnings in the financial year 2017-2018 and there is a hike of Rs 115.51 crore, when compared to the freight earnings in previous year. Kochi Refineries shared the highest freight traffic followed by FACT Kochi.

Traffic & passenger earnings details of railway stations

See also
 Southern Railway Zone
 Palakkad railway division
 Annual passenger earnings details of railway stations in Kerala
 Thiruvananthapuram Central railway station

References

External links

 

 
Transport in Thiruvananthapuram
Organisations based in Thiruvananthapuram
Southern Railway zone
1979 establishments in Kerala
Divisions of Indian Railways